Safonovo-1 is a military garrison in Murmansk Oblast, Russia, located on the Kola Peninsula on the Kola Bay,  southwest of Severomorsk. Population: about 3000 (2009 est.). It was established around 1940.

Severomorsk